Willemstad can refer to:
Willemstad, the capital city of Curaçao, Kingdom of the Netherlands
Willemstad, North Brabant, a town in Moerdijk, the Netherlands
, a hamlet near Marum, the Netherlands
, a hamlet in the Netherlands